is a French-language opera by Darius Milhaud based on The Oresteia triptych by Aeschylus in a French translation by his collaborator Paul Claudel.

Milhaud set a scene of the first play, Agamemnon, for soprano and chorus in 1913. The second part, Les Choéphores, The Libation Bearers dates from 1922. The very extensive third part, Les Euménides The Furies, was completed in 1923. The opera was partially performed in March 1931, but not performed complete till 1963 in Berlin.

Recording
The opera's premiere recording took place in 2014.

L'Orestie - Lori Phillips (Clytemnestra, soprano), Dan Kempton (Orestes, baritone), Sidney Outlaw (baritone), Sophie Delphis (speaker), Brenda Rae (soprano), Tamara Mumford (mezzo-soprano), Jennifer Lane (contralto), Julianna Di Giacomo (soprano), Kristin Eder (mezzo-soprano), Chamber Choir, University Choir, Orpheus Singers, UMS Choral Union, Percussion Ensemble, University of Michigan Symphony Orchestra, Kenneth Kiesler.  Naxos 2014

External links

References

1923 operas
Operas
French-language operas
Operas by Darius Milhaud
Operas based on Agamemnon (Aeschylus play)
Works based on The Libation Bearers
Works based on The Eumenides